Animal Crackers is a musical play with music and lyrics by Bert Kalmar and Harry Ruby and a book by George S. Kaufman and Morrie Ryskind. The musical starred the Marx Brothers.

Original production
Animal Crackers opened on Broadway on October 23, 1928, at the 44th Street Theatre, and closed April 6, 1929, running for 191 performances. The musical was produced by Sam H. Harris, staged by Oscar Eagle, and starred the four Marx Brothers and Margaret Dumont in the Brothers' second Broadway hit. Hermes Pan appeared as a chorus boy.

The play was filmed in 1930 with most of the principal leads repeating their roles from the stage production, and most of the musical numbers cut.

After The Cocoanuts ran for almost three years at the Lyric Theatre, the "anarchic" Animal Crackers became the third and last Broadway show for the Marx Brothers (I'll Say She Is was the first).  It would be their last stage show, after which they focused on film.  Vaudeville's heyday was finishing, as talking movies were beginning to become popular.  While the Marx Brothers performed in Animal Crackers in the evenings, they were busy during the day filming The Cocoanuts at Paramount's Astoria Studios in Astoria, Queens.

Song list

Act I
Opening
Hives and Dancers
The Maids — The Sixteen Markert Dancers
The Guests — Ensemble
"News" — Wally Winston and the Sixteen Markert Dancers
"Hooray for Captain Spaulding" — Hives, Jamison, Mrs. Rittenhouse, Captain Spaulding and Ensemble
"Who's Been Listening to My Heart" — Mary and John
"The Long Island Low-Down" — Wally Winston and Grace
"Go Places and Do Things" — Ensemble
Dance
"Watching the Clouds Roll By" — Mary and John
Piano speciality — Emanuel Ravelli

Act II
"When Things Are Bright and Rosy" — Wally Winston and Arabella
Reprise — Mary and John
"Cool Off" — Grace and Ensemble
The Royal Filipino Band
Harp speciality — The Professor
"Four of the Three Musketeers" — Spaulding, Jamison, Ravelli, Professor
Finale — Company

"Three Little Words" † ‡
"Oh By Jingo!" (by Lew Brown and Albert von Tilzer)†
"Show Me a Rose" ‡
"The Social Ladder" †
"I Wanna Be Loved by You" ††
"Nevertheless (I'm in Love with You)" ††
"The Blues My Naughty Sweetie Gives to Me" †††
"Everyone Says I Love You" †††

† added for Goodspeed production
‡ added for Arena Stage and Paper Mill productions 
†† added for Paper Mill production 
††† added for the Goodman production

Original 1928-9 Broadway cast

*Reprised the role in the film adaptation.

**Character not in the film adaptation.

Later productions
The musical was revived in 1982 at the Arena Stage, Washington, D.C., directed by Douglas C. Wager and choreographed by Baayork Lee. It was also revived in 1992 by Goodspeed Musicals, Connecticut.

A production in 1993 at the Paper Mill Playhouse, New Jersey, was notable for being Kristin Chenoweth's first professional role.

It was produced in the U.K. by the Manchester Royal Exchange Theatre, where it was first mounted as part of the 1995–96 season, running from the 21st of December until the 3rd February. It was then revived at that theatre's Swan Street Studio from 12 March to the 14th April 1998. It was taken on tour, and played the Sculpture Court of The Barbican Centre in a circus tent in June 1998; after further touring, it transferred to the West End at the Lyric Theatre, opening on March 16, 1999, and closing on May 15, 1999 (the run brought to an early close, having been booking until September). Starring were Ben Keaton (Spaulding), Toby Sedgwick (the Professor), Joseph Alessi (Emanuel Ravelli), and Jean Challis (Mrs Rittenhouse).

Animal Crackers was produced to open the 2009–2010 season at the Goodman Theatre in Chicago, opening September 18, 2009, and closing on November 1. The revival starred Joey Slotnick (Spaulding), Molly Brennan (the Professor), Jonathan Brody (Emanuel Ravelli), and Ora Jones (Mrs. Rittenhouse).  In addition, with a cast of only nine, several of the roles were doubled up by actors.

Animal Crackers also ran from May 6, 2011, to June 4, 2011, at The Lyric Stage Company of Boston.

"Animal Crackers" opened the 2013 season at the Williamstown Theatre Festival, running from June 26, 2013, to July 13, 2013.

References

External links
 
Animal Crackers - whyaduck

1928 musicals
Broadway musicals
Musicals set in the Roaring Twenties
Original musicals
Marx Brothers